Pascal Lorot (born 30 April 1960 at Clichy) is a French economist and geopolitician.

Biography
He earned an economics PhD from the l'Institut d'études politiques de Paris (1987).

He has been the president of Institut Choiseul for International Politics and Geoeconomics since 2003, and has also been a member of the French Commission of Energy Regulation since November, 2003.

Lorot's past activities include: director of economic studies for the French oil company Total (1995-2002), many ministerial cabinet positions, a counselor for the president of the European Bank of Reconstruction and Development (BERD), and  a researcher at the French Institute of International Relations (IFRI). He also was the president of the economical commission of the Club de l'horloge.

Lorot is the founder and director of the academic journal Géoéconomie, and director of six other journals focused on geopolitical issues including:

Monde Chinois was founded in 2004 and is a leading French journal dedicated to the analysis of economic, strategic, political and cultural evolutions in the Chinese world (People's Republic of China, Taïwan, Hong Kong and Singapore).
Politique Américaine  is a French-language journal dedicated to contemporary issues in the United States of America.
Problèmes d'Amérique latine  is a major French-language journal on current political, economic and cultural change in Latin America.
Nordiques was founded in 2003 and is the only French-language journal dedicated to the policies and strategies of states in Northern Europe and the Baltic.
Maghreb-Machrek is one of the largest, most renowned international reviews dedicated to the Arab world.

Contribution to international relations

Along with American economist and consultant Edward Luttwak, Lorot helped develop a branch of international relations study known as geoeconomics (sometimes spelled geo-economics). According to Lorot: "Geoeconomics analyzes economic strategies--notably commercial--, decided upon by states in a political setting aiming to protect their own economies or certain well-identified sectors of it, to help their national enterprises acquire technology or to capture certain segments of the world market relative to production or commercialization of a product. The possession or control of such a share confers to the entity–-state or national enterprise–-an element of power and international influence and helps to reinforce its economic and social potential." (Translated from French, italics are contributor's own)

Books
Le siècle de la Chine, Choiseul, 2007
Planète Océane. L'essentiel de la mer (co-direction of the work with Jean Guellec), Choiseul, 2006
A qui profite la guerre ?, Editions 1, 2003
Guerre et économie (co-direction of the work with Jean-François Daguzan), Ellipses, 2003
Dictionnaire de la mondialisation (direction of the work), Ellipses, 2001
Introduction à la Géoéconomie (direction of the work), Economica, 1999
La Géopolitique (with François Thual), collection "Clefs", Montchretien, 1997, 2002 (2ème édition)
Histoire de la Géopolitique, Economica, 1995
Histoire de la Perestroïka, "Que-sais-je ?", P.U.F. 1993
Les nouvelles frontières de l'Europe (direction of the work), Economica, 1993
Le réveil balte, collection "Pluriel-intervention", Hachette, 1991
La conquête de l'Est - Les atouts de la France dans le nouvel ordre européen (avec Georges Ayache), Calmann-Lévy, 1991
Les pays baltes, "Que-sais-je ?", P.U.F. 1991. 2ème éd.
Finance internationale Soviétique - Quelques éléments de réflexion, collection "Les cahiers", IFRI, 1989
Singapour, Taiwan, Hong-Kong, Corée du Sud : les nouveaux conquérants ? (with Thierry Schwob), Hatier, 1986, 3ème éd. 1988
Les zones franches dans le monde (with Thierry Schwob), collection "Notes et études documentaires", La documentation française, 1987
Les zones franches, éditions de l'Institut économique de Paris, 1984.

References

Carrefour de l'horloge people
French economists
French political scientists
Geopoliticians
1960 births
Living people
French male non-fiction writers